
Year 629 (DCXXIX) was a common year starting on Sunday (link will display the full calendar) of the Julian calendar. The denomination 629 for this year has been used since the early medieval period, when the Anno Domini calendar era became the prevalent method in Europe for naming years.

Events 
 By place 
 Byzantine Empire 
 September – Jerusalem is reconquered by the Byzantines (after 15 years of occupation), from the Persian Empire.
 September 14 – Emperor Heraclius enters Constantinople in triumph. In a ceremonial parade, accompanied by the True Cross, he is welcomed by the citizens and his son Heraclius Constantine.
 Heraclius styles himself as Basileus, Greek word for "sovereign", and takes the ancient title of "King of Kings", after his victory over Persia.

 Europe 
 King Chlothar II dies after a 16-year reign, and is succeeded by his son Dagobert I. Counseled by Bishop Arnulf of Metz and Pepin of Landen (Mayor of the Palace), he moves the capital to Paris.
 Charibert II, half-brother of Dagobert I, becomes king of Aquitaine (Southern France), and establishes his capital at Toulouse. Charibert's realm also includes Agen, Cahors, and Périgueux.

 Britain 
 Battle of Fid Eoin: King Connad Cerr of Dál Riata is killed by the Dál nAraidi of the over-kingdom of Ulaid in north-eastern Ireland (approximate date).

 Arabia 
 Summer – Muhammad, Islamic prophet, succeeds in unifying all of the nomadic tribes of the Arabian Peninsula. He converts them to Islam and prepares an expedition against the Jews.
 May - June – Battle of Khaybar: Muhammad and his followers defeat the Jews living in the fortified oasis at Khaybar, located 150 kilometers from Medina.
 September – Battle of Mu'tah: the Muslims fail to take the lands east of the Jordan River, and is pushed back near Mu'tah by the Ghassanids.

 Asia 
 April 27 – Shahrbaraz usurps the throne of the Sasanian Empire from Ardashir III, but is himself deposed forty days later by nobility in favour of Borandukht.  Khosrow III briefly rules Khorasan in the confusion, until he is assassinated by the governor of the province.
 Winter – Emperor Tai Zong of the Tang dynasty launches a campaign against the Eastern Turkic Khaganate (Central Asia).
 Emperor Jomei succeeds his great aunt, empress Suiko, and ascends to the throne of Japan.

 Americas 
 The Maya military outpost of Dos Pilas (Guatemala) is founded, in order to control trade routes in the Petexbatún region. B'alaj Chan K'awiil is installed as its leader by his father, K'inich Muwaan Jol II, the ruler of Tikal.

 By topic 
 Religion 
 Xuanzang, Chinese Buddhist monk, sets out for India from the Tang dynasty capital Chang'an on a pilgrimage.
 Muhammad meets Al-Khansa, Arabic poet, and converts her to Islam.

Births 
 Dōshō, Japanese Buddhist monk (d. 700)

Deaths 
 Chlothar II, king of the Franks
 Conall mac Máele Dúib, king of Uí Maine (Ireland)
 Connad Cerr, king of Dál Riata (Scotland)
 Eochaid Buide, king of Dál Riata
 Eustace of Luxeuil, Frankish abbot
 Jafar ibn Abi Talib, companion of Muhammad and older brother of Ali ibn Abi Talib
 Pei Ji, chancellor of the Tang dynasty (b. 570)
 Kinana ibn al-Rabi, Jewish leader

References